Cha Hak-yeon (born June 30, 1990), better known by his stage name N, is a South Korean singer, actor, presenter, and radio host, signed to 51k. He debuted as a member of the South Korean boy group VIXX in May 2012, he began his acting career in 2014 in MBC's romantic-melodrama Hotel King as Noah. He has since had roles in The Family is Coming (2015), Cheer Up! (2015), and Tomorrow Boy (2016). N began his career as a radio host in May 2015 with his show VIXX N K-pop on SBS Power FM.

Early life
Born in Changwon, South Korea, N's family consists of himself, his parents, one older brother and two older sisters. N studied at Howon University and spent a year in Japan. Before debuting with VIXX, N participated in a musical called Gwanghwamun Love Song and entered in dance competitions. He had an extensive dance background, specializing in hip-hop, ballet, jazz and contemporary. In 2009, he participated and won various competitions held by big entertainment agencies such as  SM, YG, and JYP. His blindfold dance, which he personally choreographed, won the Grand Prize at the Korean Youth Dance Festival.

Career

2012–2013: Debut with VIXX and variety show appearances

N was one of ten trainees who were contestants in Mnet's survival reality show MyDOL and was chosen to be a part of the final line-up and the 6-member boy group VIXX finally debuted with "Super Hero" on May 24, 2012 on M! Countdown. Prior to participating in MyDOL, N was featured in Brian Joo's "Let This Die" and Seo In-guk's "Shake It Up" music videos.

In the year 2012, after VIXX's debut, N became a cast member in the second season of TVN's reality television show The Romantic & Idol.

In 2013 with the release of VIXX's album, Jekyll N created the choreography to go along with title song "G.R.8.U" of the repackaged Hyde mini-album; he also appeared in Episode 4 of SBS's Television Drama The Heirs alongside his group members. That same year, he choreographed other VIXX performances for their song "Light Up the Darkness" and for a special performance on the show Dancing 9 with Justin Timberlake's "LoveStoned".

2014–2015: Big Byung, acting debut, MC-ing and Radio Hosting
In 2014, N appeared in many variety shows as a cast member such as Mnet's 4 Things Show, TVN's First Day of Work Season 3 and MBC Every 1's Hitmaker. In Hitmaker, he became a member of Jeong Hyeong-don and Defconn's first project group, Big Byung, alongside VIXX member Hyuk, Got7's Jackson and BtoB's Sungjae. Going by the stage name Dol Baeki, N and the group created two singles "Stress Come On" and "Ojingeo Doenjang".

N was cast in his first television drama in a supporting role as Noah, a bright and lively hotel employee in MBC's romantic-melodrama Hotel King. and appeared with Hongbin as a cameo in K.Will, Mamamoo and Wheesung's "Peppermint Chocolate" music video.

In 2015, N was cast in his second television drama in a supporting role as Cha Hak-yeon in SBS's The Family Is Coming  and also appeared on Running Man alongside other idols, later he joined Super Junior's Eunhyuk and Kangin as cast members of MBC Every 1's Bachelor's Party. On April 25, 2015, N joined SHINee's Minho and Red Velvet's Yeri as MC on MBC's Show! Music Core from April 25, 2015 to November 14, 2015. On May 2, 2015, N's own radio show VIXX N K-pop premiered on the radio with N as the host and fellow member Ken as a fixed guest for the Quiz King segment (every Wednesday). N was also appearing on Super Junior Kiss the Radio as a fixed guest hosted by Super Junior's Ryeowook.

On July 7, 2015, N went Off to School at Hyundai Chungun High School in Ulsan, South Korea for three days as a student in JTBC’s variety program Off to School alongside other celebrities. Towards the end of July, N was confirmed to join the cast in SBS's survival variety show Law of the Jungle in Nicaragua; the show aired in September. In August 2015, N was appointed as co-MC on Weekly Idol with AOA's Mina and Apink's  Ha-young. He was the MC of the show with the main MC's Jeong Hyeong-don and Defconn from September 2, 2015 to March 24, 2016 In September 2015, N was cast as Ha Dong-jae, a character who is brilliant yet has an oddball personality in KBS’s drama Cheer Up! which follows the lives of students at a prestigious boarding high school as they form a cheer-leading club.

2016–2018: Web dramas, First OST and musical theatre debut
In February 2016, N was cast in his first web drama as Ahn Tae-pyung, a character who takes care of his grandmother and three siblings after his parents’ death in the web drama Tomorrow Boy which aired on Naver TV Cast in March. In September, N participated in his first original soundtrack for a drama. N and Melody Day’s Yeoeun released the song "Without You" for the drama W on September 7, 2016. In the same month, N was cast alongside fellow VIXX member Lee Hong-bin and AOA’s Chanmi in the web drama What's Up With These Kids? which will air on Naver TV Cast on November 16. In November N was cast in the musical In The Heights as the lead role of Benny from December 20, 2016 to February 12, 2017 at the CJ Towol Theater in Seoul Arts Center. On July 2017, it was announced that he also co-choreographed with Jane Kim for MyTeen's debut album's Track 4 titled  '꺼내가' ('Take it out).

2019–present: Military enlistment, departure from Jellyfish, and acting
A few months before his enlistment N created his own channel on YouTube where he would share short clips of him dancing, touring, etc. under the title "오늘의 기록" Today's Record.

On March 4, 2019, N enlisted for his military service. On October 7, 2020, N was officially discharged after having completed his military service.

On October 31, 2020, N left Jellyfish Entertainment after he decided not to renew his contract, he joined 51k on November 3.

In 2021, N starred in the tvN drama Mine. The same year, he played a supporting role as Oh Kyung-tae, a warm-hearted police constable in tvN drama Bad and Crazy.

Discography

Singles

Other recordings

Songwriting credits

Filmography

Television series

Web shows

Television shows

Radio shows

Musicals

Awards and nominations

References

External links

 
 

Jellyfish Entertainment artists
VIXX members
Japanese-language singers of South Korea
South Korean dance music singers
South Korean male idols
South Korean pop singers
South Korean male singers
South Korean male television actors
South Korean male web series actors
People from Changwon
1990 births
Living people
Howon University alumni
21st-century South Korean singers
Weekly Idol members